The 2020–21 Kent State Golden Flashes men's basketball team represented Kent State University in the 2020–21 NCAA Division I men's basketball season. The Golden Flashes, led by 10th-year head coach Rob Senderoff, played their home games at the Memorial Athletic and Convocation Center, also known as the MAC Center, in Kent, Ohio as members of the East Division of the Mid-American Conference (MAC). It was the program's 105th season of play and 70th as a member of the MAC.

Previous season
The Golden Flashes finished the 2019–20 season 20–12 overall, 9–9 in MAC play to finish fourth place in the East Division. They defeated Eastern Michigan in the first round of the MAC tournament before the rest of the tournament was cancelled due to the COVID-19 pandemic.

Offseason

Departures

Incoming transfers

2020 recruiting class

Roster

Schedule and results

Kent State had to cancel games against Alcorn State, Purdue Fort Wayne, Eastern Michigan, and  Ohio, due to COVID-19 issues at those respective programs. They also postponed games against Akron, Bowling Green, and Ball State.

|-
!colspan=9 style=| Non-conference regular season

|-
!colspan=9 style=| MAC regular season

|-
!colspan=9 style=| MAC tournament

Source

References

Kent State Golden Flashes men's basketball seasons
Kent State
Kent State Golden Flashes men's basketball
Kent State Golden Flashes men's basketball